Leigh Zimmerman is an American actress, singer and dancer. She has appeared on Broadway in The Will Rogers Follies, Crazy for You and A Funny Thing Happened on the Way to the Forum with Nathan Lane and created the role of Go-To-Hell-Kitty in the 1996 Broadway production of Chicago The Musical. Leigh is also known for London's West End productions of The Seven Year Itch, Chicago, role of Velma Kelly, Contact, role of The Girl in the Yellow Dress, The Producers, role of Ulla and A Chorus Line, role of Sheila, for which she won an Olivier Award in 2013.

Career 
In 1992, she had a minor but memorable role in Home Alone 2: Lost in New York.

In 2002, she was asked to work for the second time with director Susan Stroman to create for the West End the role of The Girl in the Yellow Dress in Contact, once again at the Queens Theatre. During that time, Leigh completed feature film work on Proof with Gwyneth Paltrow and Anthony Hopkins, Red Light Runners with Harvey Keitel, The Defender with Dolph Lundgren, and Submerged with Steven Seagal.

In 2004, Leigh was asked to play the role of Miriam in the controversial play Three on A Couch by the Nobel Prize winning scientist Carl Djerassi, and worked closely with him to shape the play for the legendary London fringe theatre, The Kings Head.
Leigh then starred as Leslie Peters in the television docudrama Small Pox: Silent Weapon for the FX Channel and as Tamsin Reed on BBC's Doctors.
Leigh was thrilled when she was asked to create the role of Ulla in London's West End Production of The Producers, and her portrayal earned her an Olivier Award Nomination for Best Leading Actress in 2004.

During her run as Ulla in London from 2004 to 2006, Leigh accepted leading roles in several more highly acclaimed film and television projects. She played the English double agent, Helen Harlow, alongside Brian Cox, in ITV's The Outsiders. She starred as the Scottish police sergeant, Sergeant Beasley, in the BBC hit comedy Feel the Force. She also had a leading role as the American desperate housewife, Megan, in Ben Elton's comedy series Blessed for the BBC.

In 2006, Leigh appeared in several high-profile feature films. She portrayed Christine Snyder in United 93 directed by Paul Greengrass for Universal and Working Title Films. She spoke fluent Spanish as the gothic siren, Irene, in the soon to be released Spanish Film, La Luna en Botella (Moon in a Bottle) for Ikiru Films in Madrid and Barcelona. Leigh also stars as the California love guru, Candy Connor, in the upcoming British independent film, Are You Ready For Love for Carnaby Films.

Filmography

Film

Television

References

External links

American film actresses
American musical theatre actresses
Living people
Actors from Madison, Wisconsin
Laurence Olivier Award winners
Musicians from Madison, Wisconsin
1969 births